Mukkoottuthara is a developing Town located in  the south eastern part of Kottayam district of Kerala State, India. Sabarimala is only  from Erumely, while travelling through Mukkoottuthara. The roads passing through here are upgraded and maintained as State Highways. The main cultivation is rubber. Mukkoottuthara is famous for its decades old "Sunday Open Markets" and for its famous bamboo products (Muram, Kutta, Parampu, etc.). One of the famous tourist spots in Pathanamthitta, Perunthenaruvi Falls (the waterfall in Pampa river, where the entire river falls to about 20 feet) is just 5 kilometers from Mukkoottuthara. There are many rubber estates. The border of Kottayam and Pathanamthitta divides Mukkoottuthara into two. However the place is recorded as part of Kottayam district only.

Location 
Mukkoottuthara is located in the south eastern part of Kottayam district near the border of Pathanamthitta district and basically a hilly area. It is  7 km away from Erumely and 8 km from Kanamala. During Sabarimala pilgrimage, the town is often crowded by pilgrims. Mukkoottuthara is a main junction on Erumely - Chalakkayam state highway.

Climate 

As in many parts of Kerala, Mukkoottuthara also experiences a tropical climate. Rainfalls with thunderstorms are common in the months of June, July and August. The annual rainfall averages about 2550 mm. March, April and May are the hottest months with a less amount of rainfall. The average annual temperature here is 26.8 °C. Winter normally starts from December.

Nearby schools and Colleges 
Little Flower Public School & Junior College, Kollamula
S.N.D.P  H.S.S Venkurinji
Govt. L.P School, Kollamula
St.Mary's Convent School, Elivalykara
M.E.S College, Mukkoottuthara
Nalanda College, Mukkoottuthara
St.Antony's College, Mukkoottuthara

Hospitals
 Assisi Hospital
 Cherupushpam Hospital
 Marymatha Dental Clinic 
 Puttumannil Dental Clinic

Banks and Financial Institutions
 Catholic Syrian Bank
 State Bank of Travancore
 Central Bank of India
 Sahyadri Co-Operative Credit Society
 Meenachil Co-Operative Bank
 Venkurinji Co-Operative Bank
 Kanamala Service Co-Operative Bank
 Mothoot Finance
 Muthoot Pappachan Finance
 Mulamoottil Finance
 Kosamattam Finance

Churches
 Immanuel MarThoma Church, Thalayinathadom, Edakadathy
India Pentecostal Church of God.
 St. Thomas Syro Malabar Catholic Church
 St.Mary's Malankara Catholic Church (Town Church)
 St.Maria Gorethi Syro Malabar Catholic Church, Kollamula
 St. Ignathios Jacobite Church, Propose
 Ascension Mar Thoma Church Mukkoottuthara
Mukkoottuthara Sharon Fellowship Church
Christian brethren church
St.Antony's Church Elivalikara
st. Ignatious jacobite Syrian church mukkoottuthara (town kurishupalli )

Nearby Temples
 Thiruvambadi Sree Krishnaswami Temple
 Edakadathy Sree Dharma Sastha temple
 Edathikkavu Bhadrakali temple, Chathanthara
 Sree Bhadhrakali Temple Muttappally

References 

Villages in Kottayam district